Origins of Us is a British television series documentary series shown on BBC Two. It is about human evolution and is presented by Alice Roberts.

It consists of three episodes, each an hour long.

 Episode 1: air date 17 October 2011 – Bones
 Episode 2: air date 24 October 2011 – Guts
 Episode 3: air date 31 October 2011 – Brains

See also

 Dawn of Humanity (2015 PBS documentary)
 Prehistoric Autopsy (2012 BBC documentary)
 The Incredible Human Journey (2009 BBC documentary)
 The Origins of Us told honestly

References

External link 
 .
 
 Origins of Us at DocuWiki.net.
 
 Origins of Us at Amazon.
 Origins of Us – video search on YouTube.
 Origins of Us – video search on Dailymotion.
 
 Human Timeline (Interactive) – Smithsonian, National Museum of Natural History (August 2016).

2011 British television series debuts
2011 British television series endings
BBC high definition shows
BBC television documentaries
2010s British television miniseries
English-language television shows
Documentary films about prehistoric life
Documentary television shows about evolution